TVonics is an electronics brand focused on set top boxes and the UK Freeview market. 

TVonics' original incarnation was as a company in its own right, formed in 2004. After entering administration for the second time in 2012, the TVonics brand and IP were acquired by Pulse-Eight Limited.

History

Original incarnation
Founded in Wales in 2004 (as TVonics Ltd), the original TVonics company manufactured set-top boxes and digital video recorders. It was acquired in February 2008 by the Contact Holdings Group after the company went into administration and became TVonics Solutions Ltd.

TVonics was one of the few set-top box design houses that manufactured in the UK. The company initially entered the market with the PRISM set-top box under the TVonics and Ferguson brand. Several additional products were subsequently released under the TVonics brand including the MDR-200, DTR-Z250 and DTR-Z500.

TVonics was the original supplier of set-top boxes into the UK Government Digital Switchover Help Scheme, providing a custom designed product that met the requirements laid out by the scheme. This included support for Audio Description, a remodulator and the ability to perform automatic retuning, and a text-to-speech system created for visually impaired users.

In November 2007, TVonics was awarded the IET Start-up of the Year award.

2012 bankruptcy and new ownership

On June 12, 2012, TVonics Solutions Limited went into administration, and Gary Bell of Bell Advisory Llp was appointed administrator to the company.

On October 22, 2012, it was reported that UK based Pulse-Eight had bought the TVonics brand and the technology behind TVonics DVRs, and announced a plan to create a next-generation of TVonics set-top box based on the popular open source media player software, XBMC, running on top of Android.

Products

Prior to 2012 takeover

, products made by TVonics included the following:-

Freeview+HD Recorder
DTR-HD500
DTR-Z500HD

Freeview+ Recorder
DTR-HV250
DTR-Z500AD
DTR-Z500
DTR-Z250
DTR-HC250

Freeview Set top box
MDR-240
MDR-252
MDR-251
MDR-250
MDR-100
MFR-300
MFR-200

See also
 Pulse-Eight
 XBMC
 Freeview+
 Freeview HD

References

External links

Archive of Official TVOnics site prior to 2012 bankruptcy and sale to Pulse-Eight

Consumer electronics brands